Events from the year 1888 in Canada.

Incumbents

Crown 
 Monarch – Victoria

Federal government 
 Governor General – Henry Petty-Fitzmaurice (until June 11) then Frederick Stanley 
 Prime Minister – John A. Macdonald
 Chief Justice – William Johnstone Ritchie (New Brunswick)
 Parliament – 6th

Provincial governments

Lieutenant governors 
Lieutenant Governor of British Columbia – Hugh Nelson
Lieutenant Governor of Manitoba – James Cox Aikins (until July 1) then John Christian Schultz 
Lieutenant Governor of New Brunswick – Samuel Leonard Tilley
Lieutenant Governor of Nova Scotia – Matthew Henry Richey (until July 8) then Archibald McLelan
Lieutenant Governor of Ontario – Alexander Campbell
Lieutenant Governor of Prince Edward Island – Andrew Archibald Macdonald
Lieutenant Governor of Quebec – Auguste-Réal Angers

Premiers 
Premier of British Columbia – Alexander Edmund Batson Davie 
Premier of Manitoba – David Howard Harrison (until January 19) then Thomas Greenway 
Premier of New Brunswick – Andrew George Blair
Premier of Nova Scotia – William Stevens Fielding
Premier of Ontario – Oliver Mowat
Premier of Prince Edward Island – William Wilfred Sullivan 
Premier of Quebec – Honoré Mercier

Territorial governments

Lieutenant governors 
 Lieutenant Governor of Keewatin – James Cox Aikins (until July 1) then John Christian Schultz
 Lieutenant Governor of the North-West Territories – Edgar Dewdney (until July 1) then Joseph Royal

Premiers 
 Chairman of the Lieutenant-Governor's Advisory Council of the North-West Territories – Robert Brett (from June 30)

Events
January 19 – Thomas Greenway becomes premier of Manitoba, replacing David H. Harrison.
June 20 – The Northwest Territories holds its first general election; 22 members of the Legislative Assembly are elected.  All are independents; there are no party politics in the territories
July 11 – Manitoba election

Full date unknown
Boundary survey started by Dr. William H. Dall of the United States and Dr. George M. Dawson of Canada.

Arts and literature

New books
Among the Millet: Archibald Lampman

Births

January to June
January 18 – Charles Gavan Power, politician, Minister and Senator (d.1968)
January 20 – Ethel Wilson, novelist and short story writer (d.1980)
February 28 – George Pearkes, politician, soldier and recipient of the Victoria Cross (d.1984)
March 24 – Samuel Rosborough Balcom, politician (d.1981)
April 6 – Leonard Brockington, lawyer, civil servant and first head of the Canadian Broadcasting Corporation (CBC) (d.1966)
April 8 – Dora Mavor Moore, actor, teacher and director (d.1979)
April 23 
 Joseph Georges Bouchard, politician (d.1956)
 Georges Vanier, soldier, diplomat and Governor General of Canada (d.1967)
April 28 – Harry Crerar, General (d.1965)
May 3 – Johan Helders, photographer

July to December
July 11 – John Keiller MacKay, soldier, jurist and 19th Lieutenant Governor of Ontario (d.1970)
August 3 – Margaret Murray, journalist
September 2 – Dorothy Stevens, artist
September 7 – William Bryce, politician
September 15 – Filip Konowal, soldier, Victoria Cross recipient in 1917 (d.1959)
September 18 
 Grey Owl, writer and conservationist (d.1938)
 William Duncan Herridge, politician and diplomat (d.1961)
October 23 – Onésime Gagnon,  politician and the 20th Lieutenant Governor of Quebec (d.1961)
November 3 – Joseph Oscar Lefebre Boulanger, politician and lawyer (d.1958)
November 11 – S. E. Rogers, politician (d.1965)
November 25 – Joseph W. Noseworthy, politician (d.1956)
December 2 – Major James Coldwell, politician (d.1974)

Deaths
January 17 – Big Bear, Cree leader (b. c1825)
February 4 – Sévère Rivard, lawyer, politician and 17th Mayor of Montreal (b.1834)
March 2 – William Elliott, farmer, merchant and politician (b.1834)
April 21 – Thomas White, journalist and politician (b.1830)
May 3 – William Alexander Henry, politician (b.1816) 
May 12 – Élie Saint-Hilaire, educator, farmer and politician (b.1839) 
May 30 – James Ferrier, merchant, politician and 4th Mayor of Montreal (b.1800)
August 4 – Charles-Joseph Coursol, lawyer, politician and 13th Mayor of Montreal (b.1819)
August 24 – John Rose, politician (b.1820)
October 1 – James Gibb Ross, merchant and politician (b.1819)

Historical documents
House of Commons committee hears of cartels conspiring to control products ranging from groceries to coal to stoves and coffins

Sandford Fleming's ideas on telegraph line to Australia

U.S. Supreme Court rules on Alexander Graham Bell's telephone patent in light of previous invention claimed by "a poor mechanic"

Brief visit to Chinatown temple in Victoria, B.C.

In report on northern lands, Senate committee points out unwanted wildlife loss from "greater ease in their capture" and use of poison

Lecturer describes dogs of Hudson Strait Inuit

References
  

 
Years of the 19th century in Canada
Canada
1888 in North America